Chekhovsky (masculine), Chekhovskaya (feminine), or Chekhovskoye (neuter) is the name of several rural localities in Russia:
Chekhovsky, Moscow Oblast, a settlement in Luchinskoye Rural Settlement of Istrinsky District of Moscow Oblast
Chekhovsky, Oryol Oblast, a settlement in Zhdimirsky Selsoviet of Znamensky District of Oryol Oblast
Chekhovskoye, a selo in Alexandrovsk-Sakhalinsky District of Sakhalin Oblast